The Historical Sites of Prince Shōtoku (聖徳太子御遺跡霊場, Shōtoku taishi goiseki reijō) are a group of 28 Buddhist temples in Japan related to the life of Prince Shōtoku.

Directory

Buddhist temples in Nara Prefecture
Buddhist temples in Osaka Prefecture
Buddhist temples in Kyoto Prefecture
Buddhist temples in Hyōgo Prefecture
Buddhist pilgrimage sites in Japan
Religious buildings and structures in Kyoto Prefecture
Prince Shōtoku
Buddhism in the Asuka period